The Biryusa (in its lower reaches also called the Ona) is a river in Irkutsk Oblast and Krasnoyarsk Krai, Russia.

From the source area the river flows north over the Central Siberian Plateau. It is crossed by the Trans-Siberian railway at Biryusinsk, which is a few kilometers west of Tayshet where the Baikal Amur Mainline starts. The Biryusa then turns northwest, and finally flows together with the Chuna and forms the Taseyeva (a tributary to the Angara).

In Russian folklore it is the subject of several songs, for example, "Biryusinka."

References

Rivers of Irkutsk Oblast
Rivers of Krasnoyarsk Krai